The Winfield-Mt. Union Community School District, or WMU,  is a public school district headquartered in Winfield, Iowa.  It spans Henry, Louisa, Des Moines and Washington counties, and serves the cities of Winfield and Mount Union, and the surrounding rural areas.

Jeff Maeder became superintendent in 2015, and also became the superintendent of Columbus Community School District in 2020, after the school board agreed to a shared position.

Schools
The district operates two schools, both in Winfield:
 Winfield-Mt. Union Elementary School
 Winfield-Mt. Union Jr-Sr High School

Winfield-Mt. Union High School

Athletics
The Wolves compete in the Southeast Iowa Superconference in the following sports:
Cross Country
Volleyball
Football
Wrestling
Basketball
Boys' 1995 Class 1A State Champions
 Girls 2-time Class 1A State Champions (1995, 1996) 
Track and Field
Golf
Soccer
Baseball
Softball

See also
List of school districts in Iowa
List of high schools in Iowa

References

External links
 Winfield-Mt. Union Community School District

School districts in Iowa
Education in Louisa County, Iowa
Education in Des Moines County, Iowa
Education in Washington County, Iowa
Education in Henry County, Iowa